General Sir George Alexander Weir  (1 December 1876 – 15 November 1951) was a British Army officer who served in the Second Boer War and the First World War.

Early life 
George Weir was born in Upton upon Severn, Worcestershire, on 1 December 1876 to Dr Archibald Weir of Malvern. He was educated at Harrow School and Trinity College, Cambridge. In 1917, he married Margaret Irene, daughter of Robert More of Bexhill; the couple had a son and a daughter.

Military career 
Weir served in South Africa between 1899 and 1901 as a non-commissioned volunteer in the Worcestershire Yeomanry and was mentioned in despatches twice and awarded four clasps to his Queen's Medal. After about six months, he was commissioned as a second lieutenant and transferred into the Regular Army on 11 January 1902 as a captain in the 3rd Dragoon Guards.

By 1914, Weir had passed staff college and attained the rank of major. He was a newly appointed Senior Tactical Instructor at the Cavalry School at the start of the First World War, but he deployed with the 4th Cavalry Brigade, as Staff Captain, to France in the British Expeditionary Force. Soon afterward, in October 1914, he was appointed GSO2 of the newly formed 2nd (Cavalry) Division and in June 1915, he became commanding officer of the 2nd Battalion, Royal Irish Rifles and was slightly wounded in September.

In October 1915, Weir took command of 84th Brigade (and was promoted to Brigadier), which was almost immediately transferred to Salonika as part of the 28th Division.

During his war service during this period, Weir was wounded, mentioned in despatches, and awarded the Distinguished Service Order.

After the War, in 1922, Weir was appointed as Commandant of the Equitation School and Inspector of Cavalry. In 1927, he was posted to India as General Officer Commanding, Bombay District, and in 1932 he commanded the 55th (West Lancashire) Division of the Territorial Army. In 1934 he became General Officer Commanding the British Troops in Egypt (re-titled as General Officer Commanding-in-Chief in 1936), and was promoted to full general in October 1937.

Honorary roles and retirement 
Weir retired from the Army on 12 April 1938 and joined the Officers' Reserve (until December 1943).

Weir held appointments as Honorary Colonel to the 3rd Carabiniers (Prince of Wales's Dragoon Guards)  (September 1929 until December 1946), to the 8th Battalion, The Worcestershire Regiment (TA) (June 1938 until December 1946) and the 639th Heavy Regiment, Royal Artillery (The Worcestershire Regiment) (January 1947 until September 1949).

Weir was Deputy Lieutenant of Worcestershire from 26 June 1941 and served as Vice-Chairman of the Worcester Territorial Army Association. He died on 15 November 1951.

References

|-

Knights Commander of the Order of the Bath
Companions of the Order of St Michael and St George
Companions of the Distinguished Service Order
Officers of the Order of Saints Maurice and Lazarus
Recipients of the Croix de Guerre 1914–1918 (France)
1876 births
1951 deaths
British Army cavalry generals of World War I
3rd Dragoon Guards officers
British Army personnel of the Second Boer War
Deputy Lieutenants of Worcestershire
People from Upton-upon-Severn
People educated at Harrow School
Alumni of Trinity College, Cambridge
Royal Ulster Rifles officers
Worcestershire Yeomanry soldiers
Admirals and Generals from Worcestershire
Graduates of the Staff College, Camberley
Military personnel from Worcestershire